Wounds of Armenia ( Verk Hayastani) is an 1841 historical novel by Khachatur Abovian. Written in the Araratian (Yerevan) dialect, Wounds of Armenia is considered Abovian's chef d'œuvre. It is Abovian's debut novel, the first Armenian novel and the first modern Eastern Armenian literary work. Thanks to Wounds of Armenia, Khachatur Abovian is acknowledged as the founder of the modern Eastern Armenian language.

It was first published in 1858 in Tiflis, which was the cultural center of Russian Armenians before the Russian Civil War, ten years after Abovian disappeared.

Name
The book is commonly known as Wounds of Armenia (Verk Hayastani), although it was originally titled Wounds of Armenia: Lamentation of a Patriot (Վերք Հայաստանի. ողբ հայրենասերի) by Abovian.

Background
Khachatur Abovian was born in Kanaker, a small village near Yerevan in 1809 which was part of the Persian Empire at the time. In 1827, Yerevan was captured by the Russians. From 1830 to 1836, Abovian studied at the University of Dorpat. Abovian wrote the book in 1841.

Plot
The story which Abovian named Wounds of Armenia is based on an incident which happened in his hometown Kanaker during the Russo-Persian War of 1826–1828.

A young Armenian girl named Takhuni is kidnapped by soldiers of Hossein Khan Sardar, the head of the Erivan Khanate. Aghasi, who is the main hero, kills the Sardar's men and saves her. The Persian governor's brother Hassan decides to punish Aghasi and thus destroys a number of Armenian towns.

The 2005 book The Heritage of Armenian Literature by Agop Jack Hacikyan et al argues that "though symbolic, the incident, was sufficiently potent to arouse sentiments of patriotism, national pride, and dignity". The authors then note that "the book, reads like a poem, in which the author, like a son, is having an honest, forthright talk with the people, in their own Kanaker dialect". They claim "its message is direct and strong: an appeal from the bottom of the heart".

Publications and translations
The novel was first published in 1858 in Tiflis, then part of the Russian Empire, now called Tbilisi as the capital of Georgia. It was later published during the Soviet era (1948, 1959, 1975) and in independent Armenia (2005, 2009). Since now the novel had 16 publications in Armenian in separate books. 

The first language to be translated into was Russian (by Sergey Shervinsky). In 1948, the Russian translated edition was published in both in Yerevan and Moscow and later republished in 1955, 1971 and 1977 in Yerevan. In 1978 and 2005 it was published in Moscow.

In 2005, Vahé Baladouni translated the preface of Abovian's novel into English. It was published in Yerevan by the Museum of Literature and Art.

The novel was also published in Latvian (1960), Lithuanian (1980) and Romanian (2015).

See also
Eastern Armenian
Classical Armenian
Yerevan dialect

References

External links
The full text at the Armenian WikiSource
The full text at the Eastern Armenian National Corpus

Armenian language
1841 novels
1858 books
Armenian-language novels
Novels set in Armenia